The 2004 Malta International Tournament (known as the Rothmans Tournament for sponsorship reasons) was the 12th edition of the Malta International Tournament. Held between 14 February and 18 February 2004, the tournament was contested by host country Malta, Estonia, Moldova and Belarus U-21.

Matches

Winner

Statistics

Goalscorers

See also 
China Cup
Cyprus International Football Tournament

References 

2003–04 in Maltese football
2003–04 in Moldovan football
2004 in Lithuanian football
2004